White Cottage, also known as Twin Oaks, is a historic house in Natchez, Mississippi, USA.

History
The land belonged to the Routh family in the 18th century. It was acquired by Lewis Evans, a planter and sheriff, from 1810 to 1814. It was purchased by Pierce Connelly in 1832. Roughly a decade later, in 1841, it was purchased by Charles Dubuisson, the former president of Jefferson College and later a member of Mississippi legislature. By 1940, it was purchased by Homer Whittington.

Heritage significance
It has been listed on the National Register of Historic Places since October 13, 1983.

References

Houses on the National Register of Historic Places in Mississippi
Greek Revival houses in Mississippi
Houses completed in 1814
Houses in Adams County, Mississippi